Chondi is the name of several villages in India, including:
Chondhi, Alibag in the Alibag subdistrict, Raigad district, Maharashtra
Chondhi, Yavatmal in the Yavatmal district, Maharashtra